Lisów  (German Lissau) is a village in the administrative district of Gmina Herby, within Lubliniec County, Silesian Voivodeship, in southern Poland.

The village has a population of 1,727.

References

Villages in Lubliniec County